Honsberger is a surname. Notable people with the surname include:

Fred Honsberger (1951–2009), American radio personality
Ross Honsberger (1929–2016), Canadian mathematician